Rhaeticus is a lunar impact crater that lies astride the equator of the Moon, on the southeast edge of the Sinus Medii. To the north-northwest is the crater Triesnecker, and due south can be found the worn remnant of the walled plain Hipparchus. The crater was named after Austrian astronomer Georg Joachim Rheticus.

Description
The outer wall of Rhaeticus is heavily disintegrated, with rifts and notches in the northeast. The wall is most intact along the eastern face, while in the northwest it is little more than a low rise in the surface. There is also a low cut in the south-southeast wall. The overall shape of the rim is that of a rough hexagon that is slightly elongated in the north–south direction. The interior has been resurfaced by lava, and only a few low rises remain in the surface. Beginning at the crest of the eastern wall is a chain of craterlets that continue to the east-northeast for about a crater diameter.

Running southwest from Rhaeticus to the crater Réaumur is a long rille, which is difficult to make out near Rhaeticus because of the group of mountains at that crater's southwest. The crater itself is 43 kilometers wide at one diameter and 49 kilometers long at another. It is from the Pre-Imbrian period, which lasted from 4.55 to 3.85 billion years ago.

Satellite craters
By convention these features are identified on lunar maps by placing the letter on the side of the crater midpoint that is closest to Rhaeticus.

References

External links

Rhaeticus at the Moon Wiki
 

Impact craters on the Moon